The candidate division SR1 and gracilibacteria code (translation table 25) is  used in two groups of (so far) uncultivated bacteria found in marine and fresh-water environments and in the intestines and oral cavities of mammals among others.  The difference to the standard and the bacterial code is that UGA represents an additional glycine codon and does not code for termination.

The code 

   AAs  = FFLLSSSSYY**CCGWLLLLPPPPHHQQRRRRIIIMTTTTNNKKSSRRVVVVAAAADDEEGGGG
Starts = ---M-------------------------------M---------------M------------
 Base1 = TTTTTTTTTTTTTTTTCCCCCCCCCCCCCCCCAAAAAAAAAAAAAAAAGGGGGGGGGGGGGGGG
 Base2 = TTTTCCCCAAAAGGGGTTTTCCCCAAAAGGGGTTTTCCCCAAAAGGGGTTTTCCCCAAAAGGGG
 Base3 = TCAGTCAGTCAGTCAGTCAGTCAGTCAGTCAGTCAGTCAGTCAGTCAGTCAGTCAGTCAGTCAG

Bases: adenine (A), cytosine (C), guanine (G) and thymine (T) or uracil (U).

Amino acids: Alanine (Ala, A), Arginine (Arg, R), Asparagine (Asn, N), Aspartic acid (Asp, D), Cysteine (Cys, C), Glutamic acid (Glu, E), Glutamine (Gln, Q), Glycine (Gly, G), Histidine (His, H), Isoleucine (Ile, I), Leucine (Leu, L), Lysine (Lys, K), Methionine (Met, M), Phenylalanine (Phe, F), Proline (Pro, P), Serine (Ser, S), Threonine (Thr, T), Tryptophan (Trp, W), Tyrosine (Tyr, Y), and Valine (Val, V).

Difference from the standard code

Initiation codons 
 AUG, GUG, UUG

Systematic range 
 Candidate Division SR1
 Gracilibacteria

See also  
 List of genetic codes

References 

Molecular genetics
Gene expression
Protein biosynthesis